The Puente de Ovando (English: Ovando Bridge) is a historic bridge in the city of Puebla, in the Mexican state of Puebla.

Description and history 
The Ovando Bridge is a small stone bridge across the river, in the Analco neighborhood of Puebla. The bridge was built in about 1775, replacing the old bridge that had fallen into disrepair, which connected the Spanish settlements with the downtown of Puebla. Next to the bridge was the house of the councilor Agustín de Ovando y Villavicencio, hence the name of the bridge. Today, the Ovando Bridge is one of the symbols of Puebla, a place full of stories and legends.

References

External links
 
 Nuestra magia poblana: El puente de Ovando, Televisa Puebla (October 29, 2015)

Bridges in Mexico
Buildings and structures in Puebla (city)